Charles Raymond was a British actor and film director of the silent era.

Selected filmography
Director
 Hamlet (1912)
 Robin Hood Outlawed (1912)
 Lieutenant Daring and the Labour Riots (1913)
 The Great London Mystery (1920)

References

External links
 

Year of birth missing
Year of death missing
British film directors